Shine Muscat is a diploid table grape cultivar resulted from a cross of Akitsu-21 and 'Hakunan' (V. vinifera) made by National Institute of Fruit Tree Science (NIFTS) in Japan in 1988. It has large yellow-green berries, crisp flesh texture, muscat flavor, high soluble solids concentration and low acidity.
Nomenclature registration number is "Grape Agriculture and Forestry No. 21"「ぶどう農林21号」.

Overview and history 
It is a cultivar that was bred at the National Institute of Agrobiological Sciences' grape research center (formerly the Akitsu Branch of the Fruit Tree Experiment Station of the Ministry of Agriculture, Forestry and Fisheries（旧農林水産省果樹試験場安芸津支場）) in Akitsu-cho, Higashihiroshima City, Hiroshima Prefecture and is an early maturing variety that ripens in mid-August in Hiroshima, where it was bred.
The Muscat of Alexandria, commonly known as Muscat in Japan, is a grape with good taste and texture, but European grapes, including this species, are prone to cracking and disease in areas with heavy rainfall and are not suited to the Japanese climate, requiring facilities such as glasshouses for cultivation.
Resistant to disease and tolerant of the Japanese climate, American grapes are difficult to bite through and are generally considered to be less palatable than European grapes. It also has a unique aroma called foxy scent.
To improve on these shortcomings, the cultivar Steuben, which has the highest sugar content of all American grapes, and Muscat of Alexandria were crossed, and Grape Akitsu 21 was born.
This Akitsu 21 had a flesh similar to Muscat of Alexandria and was rather large, but it had a not-so-good aroma, a mixture of Muscat and Foxy scents.
Therefore, a large-grained European grape cultivar called "Hakunan" (a cross between Cattacurgan and Kaiji), which was created at the Uehara Grape Research Institute in Yamanashi Prefecture, was crossed with a variety that had the best quality and taste but gave up badly due to skin contamination, and this variety with only Muscat aroma was born.
The grapes were selected from the seedlings of a cross between Akitsu No. 21 and Hakunan in 1988, and from 1999 to 2002, the grapes were named "Grape Akitsu No. 23" and submitted to a strain adaptability test to examine their characteristics nationwide.
Named "Shine-Muscat" and registered on September 5, 2003, as Grape No. 21 of Agriculture and Forestry, and registered on March 9, 2006, as Grape No. 13,891 (valid for 30 years).

Pedigree of Shine Muscat 
The "Grape Akitsu 21" was created by crossing Muscat of Alexandria with Steuben, a cultivar with a high sugar content among American grapes.

                           ┌─ Steuben
              ┌─ Akitsu-21─┤
              │            └─ Muscat of Alexandria
Shine Muscat ─┤
              │            ┌─ Katta Kurgan
              └─ Hakunan ──┤
　　　　　　　　　　　　　　    │        　┌─ Flame Tokay
                           └─ Kaiji ──┤
　　　　 　　　　　　　　　　　　  　　     └─ Neomuscat

Plant morphology 

The clusters are cylindrical and weigh 400-500 grams. The color at maturity is yellowish green, and the grains are short and oval. The size is 11 to 12 grams, about the same as Kyoho. It has a high sugar content of about 20 degrees and a low acid content of 0.3 to 0.4 g/100 mL. With gibberellin treatment, the whole skin can be eaten without seeds.
The leaves are green in color and wavy at maturity. The underside of the leaf is densely covered with flat-lying hairs.
In terms of climate, the grapes are relatively resistant to cold and the color does not deteriorate even when the summer is extremely hot. In terms of taste, texture, and aroma, it is comparable to European grapes in quality. It also has excellent storability.
It is a vigorous tree that can produce its first harvest three years after planting.

Peculiar cultivation 

 

The following descriptions are mainly of cultivation methods used in Japan.

Shape of an ear (e.g. sprout) 
For the production of relatively large grains and bunches,
shape the flower ear to 3.5 to 4 cm, adjust the axis to 9.5 to 10 cm at about 15 days after full bloom, and place 4 to 5 seeds on the upper stalk and 2 to 3 seeds on the middle to lower stalk to make a cluster of 45 to 50 seeds.

Treatment with plant hormone 
The method of producing seedless or large fruits using gibberellin, a type of plant growth hormone, was developed in Japan. This method has been adapted to Shine Muscat as well as many other grapes for table grapes. It is important to note that the timing and concentration of the treatment is strictly regulated by the type of grape. many of these methods have been patented.
This process makes the skin thin and the fruit edible as is.
This grape belongs to a diploid European variety. The following treatments are specific to this variety.
The objective is to achieve seedlessness and granule enlargement, and the number of treatments can be either one or two, depending on the purpose.
In addition to gibberellin, there is a way to use a combination of forchlorfenuron; see the instructions for the commercial chemical for details.

If you use the tablet in the picture on the right, the concentration is 25 ppm for one tablet and 200 cc of water.

In the photo on the right, the stamens are dyed with food coloring in a solution of gibberellin to mark the stamens as having been treated. It does not have to be red.

Production outside Japan 
Japan's National Institute of Agrobiological Sciences, the developer of Shine-Muscat, registered the variety in Japan in 2006. However, the variety was not registered outside Japan because it was not intended for export. During that time, Shine Muscat seedlings outflowed from Japan to Korea and China, they were sold at a lower price than in Japan.

The International Convention for the Protection of New Varieties of Plants requires that fruit varieties be registered outside the home country within a certain period of time (six years for grapes) from the date of registration in the home country.
Japan lost the right to collect royalties because it had not registered the variety by 2012. The Ministry of Agriculture, Forestry and Fisheries estimates that Japan lost 10 billion yen a year in this case.

In Korea, Yeongcheon, Gimcheon, Sangju, Gyeongsan and Gyeongju in Gyeongbuk, Korea are the region which produce Shine Muscats and export their products about one-third the price in Japan. Korean varieties of Shine Muscat are sold in markets such as Hong Kong, Thailand, Malaysia, and Vietnam.

Chinese products are exported overseas at even lower prices. However, there are some low-quality products on the market, such as those that contain seeds, have thick skin, or have low sugar content.

References

Table grape varieties
Japanese fruit